The 1959 Maryland Terrapins football team represented the University of Maryland in the 1959 NCAA University Division football season. In their first season under head coach Tom Nugent, the Terrapins compiled a 5–5 record (4–2 in conference), finished in third place in the Atlantic Coast Conference, and were outscored by their opponents 188 to 184. The team's statistical leaders included Dale Betty with 552 passing yards, Jim Joyce with 567 rushing yards, and Gary Collins with 350 receiving yards.

Schedule

References

Maryland
Maryland Terrapins football seasons
Maryland Terrapins football